Yogoda Satsanga Mahavidyalaya, established in 1967, is a general degree college in Ranchi, Jharkhand, India. It was established in 1967 under the aegis of Yogoda Satsanga Society of India. It offers undergraduate and postgraduate courses in arts, commerce and sciences. It is affiliated to  Ranchi University.

Departments

Science
Chemistry 
Physics 
Mathematics 
Botany 
Zoology 
Computer application and Information Technology

Arts and Commerce
Hindi
English
History
Political Science
Economics
Philosophy
Commerce
Business Administration

See also
Education in India
Literacy in India
List of institutions of higher education in Jharkhand

References

External links
 http://www.ysmranchi.net/

Colleges affiliated to Ranchi University
Educational institutions established in 1967
Universities and colleges in Ranchi
Universities and colleges in Jharkhand
1967 establishments in Bihar